Abdul Razak Hussein formed the first Razak cabinet after being invited by Tuanku Abdul Halim Muadzam Shah to begin a new government following the resignation of the previous Prime Minister of Malaysia, Tunku Abdul Rahman. Prior to the resignation, Rahman led (as Prime Minister) the third Rahman cabinet, a coalition government that consisted of members of the component parties of Alliance Party. It was the 5th cabinet of Malaysia formed since independence.

This is a list of the members of the first cabinet of the second Prime Minister of Malaysia, Abdul Razak Hussein.

Composition

Full members
The federal cabinet consisted of the following ministers:

Assistant ministers

Composition before cabinet dissolution

Full members

Deputy ministers

Assistant ministers

Composition before cabinet dissolution

Full members

Deputy ministers

See also
 Members of the Dewan Rakyat, 3rd Malaysian Parliament
 List of parliamentary secretaries of Malaysia#First Razak cabinet

References

Cabinet of Malaysia
1970 establishments in Malaysia
1974 disestablishments in Malaysia
Cabinets established in 1970
Cabinets disestablished in 1974